Göktepe is a village in Turkey's Şanlıurfa Province, in its Haliliye district. It is located by the Urfa-Viranşehir highway and the Mucid Dere stream. There is an archaeological mound located north of the village, measuring 80 m in diameter and 20 m in height. An archaeological survey in 1963 encountered Early and Middle Bronze Age as well as Roman and Byzantine artifacts. As of the 1990 census, the village of Göktepe had a population of 239.

References 

Villages in Şanlıurfa Province